is a Japanese professional boxer, who has held the WBO Asia Pacific title since 2022.

Professional boxing career

Early career

Rookie of the Year tournament
Abe made his professional debut against Tetsuya Hirokawa on 2 June 2013. He won the fight by unanimous decision. After suffering his first professional loss to Koki Kobayashi by unanimous decision on 29 July 2013, Abe won his next four fights to qualify for the featherweight event of the East Japan Rookie of the year tournament. Abe faced the undefeated Haruka Itakura in the tournament semifinals on 25 September 2014. He won the fight by a second-round technical knockout. Advancing to the East Japan Rookie of the Year tournament finals, which were held on 2 November 2014, Abe faced Naoto Moriya (6–1–1). He won the fight by a first-round knockout. He was awarded the "Fighting Award" at the post-fight ceremony.

Abe was booked to face the West Japan featherweight Rookie of the Year Kyohei Tonomoto (5–1) on 21 December 2014 in the featherweight All Japan Rookie of the Year deciding match. He won the fight by unanimous decision. Two of the judges scored the bout 49–45 in his favor, while the third judge awarded Abe a 49–46 scorecard.

Rise up the ranks
After winning the All Japan Rookie title, Abe faced the twelve fight veteran Shingo Kusano. He lost the fight by majority decision, with scores of 58–57, 58–57 and 57–57. Abe rebounded by winning his next three fights (against Ryo Hino, Rokuhei Suzuki and Hikaru Marugame), before rematching Shingo Kusano on 19 July 2016. He avenged his second professional loss by technical knockout, stopping Kusano in the fifth round. Abe faced Tsuyoshi Tameda on 17 October 2016, in his final fight of the year. He won the bout by an eight-round technical knockout.

Abe faced the WBC-ABC super featherweight champion Joe Noynay in a featherweight non-title bout on 28 February 2017. He won the fight by unanimous decision, with scores of 78–75, 77–75 and 77–76. Eight months later, on 2 October 2017, Abe faced the more experienced Satoshi Hosono. He won the fight by technical decision, with scores of 89–83, 90–81 and 89–83. The bout was stopped early in the ninth round, due to a cut above Hosono's right eye, which was caused by an accidental clash of heads.

Abe faced Daisuke Watanabe on 2 March 2018, in his first fight of the year. He won the fight by unanimous decision, with scores of 78–75, 78–75 and 79–73. After beating Masashi Noguchi in a stay-busy fight by a sixth-round stoppage on 1 September 2018, Abe was booked to face the unbeaten Daisuke Sugita in a Japanese title eliminator on 19 January 2019. He won the fight by unanimous decision, with one judge scoring the fight 79–71 for him, while the remaining two judges gave him all eight rounds of the bout.

Abe challenged the reigning Japanese featherweight champion Taiki Minamoto on 1 May 2019, in the main event of "Dangan 223" which took place at the Korakuen Hall. The fight was ruled a majority draw. Two judges scored the fight as an even 94–94 draw, while the third judge scored the fight 95–94 for Abe. Following this fight, Minamoto vacated the featherweight title. As such, the #2 ranked Japanese featherweight contender Abe was scheduled to face the #1 ranked contender Ryo Sagawa for the vacant belt on 13 September 2019. Sagawa won the fight by unanimous decision, with one judge scoring the fight 96–95 for him, while the remaining two judges scored the fight 96–94 for Sagawa.

Abe faced the undefeated Ren Sasaki on 13 October 2020, following a thirteen-month absence from the sport. He successfully rebounded from his two failed title bids with a unanimous decision victory. Two of the judges scored the fight 78–74 for Abe, while the third judge scored the fight 77–75 in his favor. Abe next faced Koshin Takeshima on 21 April 2021. He won the fight by technical decision, with scores of 67–64, 68–63 and 67–64. Abe next faced Daisuke Watanabe on 27 November 2021. He won the fight by a third-round stoppage, as Watanabe's corner opted to retire their fighter at the end of the round.

WBO Asia Pacific featherweight champion
Abe challenged the incumbent Japanese featherweight champion Hinata Maruta, in what was Maruta's second title defense, on 15 May 2022. The bout was scheduled as the event headliner for "Dangan 250", which took place at the Sumida City Gymnasium in Tokyo, Japan. Aside from the Japanese title, the vacant WBO Asia Pacific featherweight belt was on the line as well. He utilized outfighting tactics to outbox Maruta for the majority of the fight, en route to winning it by unanimous decision, with scores of 118–109, 116–111 and 115–112. On August 19, 2022, the Japanese Boxing Association named him their "Fighter of the Year".

Abe made the first defense of his Japanese and WBO Asia Pacific titles against the undefeated Jinki Maeda on 3 December 2022. He won the fight by majority decision, with two judges scoring the bout 117–111 and 116–112 for him, while the third judge had in an even 114–114 draw. Abe was named the December 2022 "Fighter of the Month" by the East Japan Boxing Association following this victory.

On 13 January 2023, the IBF ordered a final featherweight title eliminator between Abe and the former two-weight world champion Kiko Martínez. Abe vacated the Japanese featherweight title on the same day. The title eliminator bout is scheduled to take place on 8 April 2023, at the Ariake Arena in Ariake, Tokyo.

Professional boxing record

References

Living people
1993 births
Japanese male boxers
Sportspeople from Fukushima Prefecture
Featherweight boxers
Super-featherweight boxers
Southpaw boxers